

The Great River Bridge in Westfield, Massachusetts, is a pair of camelback truss spans over the Westfield River carrying  US 202 / Route 10.  The original bridge was completed in 1939, and a second bridge was finished in 2009.

History
Begun after a flood in 1938 and completed the next year, the original bridge was the main north–south crossing of the river for seventy years.

With time, however, the span became a bottleneck that figuratively split the city. The new bridge opened for traffic and the old one was closed for renovation on August 18, 2009. The area surrounding was improved with new sidewalks, lights, and pavement. The upstream (1938) bridge carries three lanes of southbound traffic, and the downstream (2007) bridge carries three lanes northbound. A small park lies between the approaches on both sides of the river.

One previous constraint was a low rail bridge to the north of the original span, which required trucks to take a circuitous route to get across the river.  This bridge was replaced by a new one just south of the original, but still north of the original river crossing, with more elevation so that trucks could access the southbound (upstream) span.

In 2017, work began on conversion of the abandoned train bridge, upstream of the two road bridges, to a rail trail as part of the Columbia Greenway's final extension. The trail will connect to the bridge's parks.

Reconstruction of the original bridge
Rehabilitation of the original bridge was halted in April 2010 because of the discovery of major deterioration of the understructure.  It was reported on July 18, 2010, in The Republican of Springfield that another year would be added to the project at a cost of an additional "several million dollars", according to State Senator Michael Knapik. It was reopened in November 2011.

References

External links

Westfield, Massachusetts
Truss bridges in the United States
Bridges completed in 1939
Bridges completed in 2009
U.S. Route 202
Bridges of the United States Numbered Highway System
Steel bridges in the United States
Road bridges in Massachusetts